Potter is an unincorporated community in Atchison County, Kansas, United States.

History
Potter had its start in the year 1886 by the building of the railroad through that territory. It was named for Joseph Potter, a pioneer settler.

Potter had a post office with ZIP code 66077, which opened on May 14, 1865, and closed on May 16, 2009.

References

Further reading

External links
 Atchison County maps: Current, Historic, KDOT

Unincorporated communities in Atchison County, Kansas
Unincorporated communities in Kansas
1886 establishments in Kansas
Populated places established in 1886